Below are the results of season seven of the World Poker Tour (2008-2009). The WPT Celebrity Invitational had the first female winner of the WPT.

Results

Spanish Championship
 Casino: Casino Barcelona, Barcelona
 Buy-in: €5,000
 5-Day Event: Friday, May 23, 2008 to Tuesday, May 27, 2008
 Number of Entries: 253 
 Total Prize Pool: €1,278,396 ($1,993,072)
 Number of Payouts: 27

Bellagio Cup IV
 Casino: Bellagio, Las Vegas
 Buy-in: $15,000
 7-Day Event: Friday, July 11, 2008 to Thursday, July 17, 2008
 Number of Entries: 446
 Total Prize Pool: $6,489,300
 Number of Payouts: 100
 Winning Hand:

Legends of Poker
 Casino: Bicycle Casino, Los Angeles
 Buy-in: $10,000
 6-Day Event: Saturday, August 23, 2008 to Thursday, August 28, 2008
 Number of Entries: 373
 Total Prize Pool: $3,520,738
 Number of Payouts: 36
 Winning Hand:

Borgata Poker Open
 Casino: Borgata, Atlantic City
 Buy-in: $10,000
 5-Day Event: Sunday, September 14, 2008 to Thursday, September 18, 2008
 Number of Entries: 516
 Total Prize Pool: $5,000,000
 Number of Payouts: 54
 Winning Hand:

North American Poker Championship
 Casino: Fallsview Casino Resort, Niagara Falls, Ontario, Canada
 Buy-in: Can$10,000 (US$8,500)
 7-Day Event: Friday, October 10, 2008 to Thursday, October 16, 2008
 Number of Entries: 454
 Total Prize Pool: Can$4,374,475 (US$3,829,391)
 Number of Payouts: 45
 Winning Hand:

Festa Al Lago
 Casino: Bellagio, Las Vegas 
 Buy-in: $15,000
 7-Day Event: Monday, October 20, 2008 to Sunday, October 26, 2008
 Number of Entries: 368
 Total Prize Pool: $5,354,000
 Number of Payouts: 50
 Winning Hand:

Foxwoods World Poker Finals
 Casino: Foxwoods, Mashantucket, Connecticut
 Buy-in: $10,000
 7-Day Event: Wednesday, November 5, 2008 to Tuesday, November 11, 2008
 Number of Entries: 412
 Total Prize Pool: $3,876,508
 Number of Payouts: 50
 Winning Hand:

Doyle Brunson Five Diamond World Poker Classic
 Casino: Bellagio, Las Vegas
 Buy-in: $15,000
 7-Day Event: Saturday, December 13, 2008 to Friday, December 19, 2008
 Number of Entries: 497
 Total Prize Pool: $7,231,350
 Number of Payouts: 100
 Winning Hand:

Southern Poker Championship
 Casino: Beau Rivage, Biloxi
 Buy-in: $10,000
 4-Day Event: Wednesday, January 14, 2009 to Saturday, January 17, 2009
 Number of Entries: 283
 Total Prize Pool: $2,662,747
 Number of Payouts: 27
 Winning Hand:

L.A. Poker Classic
 Casino: Commerce Casino, Los Angeles
 Buy-in: $10,000
 6-Day Event: Saturday, February 21, 2009 to Thursday, February 26, 2009
 Number of Entries: 696
 Total Prize Pool: $6,681,600
 Number of Payouts: 63
 Winning Hand:

L.A. Poker Classic
 Casino: Commerce Casino, Los Angeles
 Buy-in:
 2-Day Event: February 28, 2009
 Number of Entries: 433
 Total Prize Pool:
 Number of Payouts:
 Winning Hand:

Bay 101 Shooting Star
 Casino: Bay 101, San Jose, California
 Buy-in: $10,000
 5-Day Event: Monday, March 16, 2009 to Friday, March 20, 2009
 Number of Entries: 391
 Total Prize Pool: $3 714 500
 Number of Payouts: 45
 Winning Hand:

Foxwoods Poker Classic
 Casino: Foxwoods, Mashantucket, Connecticut
 Buy-in: $10,000
 6-Day Event: Friday, April 3, 2009 to Wednesday, April 8, 2009
 Number of Entries: 259
 Total Prize Pool: $2,436,930
 Number of Payouts: 30
 Winning Hand:

WPT World Championship
 Casino: Bellagio, Las Vegas
 Buy-in: $25,000
 8-Day Event: Saturday, April 18, 2009 to Saturday, April 25, 2009
 Number of Entries: 338
 Total Prize Pool: $8,172,250
 Number of Payouts: 50
 Winning Hand:

Other Events
During season 7 of the WPT there were two special events that did not apply to the Player of the Year standings:
 The LA Poker Classic Heads Up Championship - February 18–20, 2009 - Commerce Casino - prelude to Event #10: L.A. Poker Classic
 The WPT Celebrity Invitational - Feb 28 - Mar 2, 2009 - Commerce Casino - postscript to Event #10: L.A. Poker Classic

References

World Poker Tour
2008 in poker
2009 in poker